Kelly Patrick Corcoran (August 7, 1958—April 17, 2002) was an American child actor and a brother of Donna, Noreen, and Kevin Corcoran.

Early life
He was born in Santa Monica, California, on August 7, 1958.
He was the youngest child born to William "Bill" Corcoran, Sr. (1905–1958), and the former Kathleen McKenney (1917–1972). He had several siblings: Donna, Hugh, Noreen, Brian, Kevin, William Jr., and Kerry Corcoran. A few of his siblings were also child stars.

Death
Kelly Corcoran died, at age 43, in Sanger, California.

Filmography
1963 - The Courtship of Eddie's father
1966 - Picture Mommy Dead, This Savage Land

Television series
 1966 - 1967 - The Road West as Kip Pride

References

External links

1958 births
2002 deaths
American male television actors
American male child actors
Male actors from Los Angeles
Male actors from Fresno, California
20th-century American male actors